Leonne Suzanne Stentler (born 23 April 1986) is a Dutch former footballer. She played as a defender.

Club career
Stentler played for ADO Den Haag in the Eredivisie before moving to AFC Ajax in 2012, to play in the first season of the BeNe League.

International career
In March 2009 Rotterdam-born Stentler made her senior international debut, against South Africa at the Cyprus Cup.

Stentler was called up to be part of the national team for the UEFA Women's Euro 2013.

In total, Stentler earned 16 caps between 2009 and 2013.

Honours

Club
ADO Den Haag
Winner
  Eredivisie: 2011–12
  KNVB Women's Cup: 2011–12

References

External links
 
 
 
 Leonne Stentler at Fussballtransfers.com 
 Leonne Stentler at Soccerdonna.de 
 Leonne Stentler at Vrouwenvoetbal Nederland 

1986 births
Living people
Footballers from Rotterdam
Dutch women's footballers
Netherlands women's international footballers
AFC Ajax (women) players
ADO Den Haag (women) players
Women's association football defenders